Deena Mehta is an Indian businesswoman, broker, investor, financial adviser, chartered accountant and social activist. She is the managing director and chief executive officer of Asit C. Mehta Investment Intermediates Ltd. Mehta was one of the first female members of Bombay Stock Exchange, Mumbai and became its first woman president.

Career
She is on the Board of Reliance Asset Reconstruction Company Limited, Magma Housing Finance Limited, Fino Payments Bank Limited, and NMIMS Alumni Association as an Independent Director. She is a member of the India Board of CISI Institute, a subsidiary of the London Stock Exchange. She is the promoter director of Central Depository Services Ltd. as well as the South Asian Federation of exchanges, the association of stock exchanges of SAARC countries. She has been an invitee to International Securities Regulators Organization, and member of the Index Committee and Advisory Committee on Mutual Funds of Stock Exchange, Mumbai and a member of SEBI Committees such as Review of Eligibility (CORE) norms of SEBI, Derivative Committee, Delisting Committee, Ethics Committee and Investor Education.

Deena Mehta is Vice Chairman of Prempuri Ashram Trust.

 
Mehta has been a member of the board of directors of the following organizations:

Cotton Association of India 
Board of Central Depository Services (India) Limited
National Payment Corporation of India since August 2011
Gandhar Oil  Refinery (India) Limited 
Magma Housing Finance Ltd.
Advisory committee of Wilson College M.Com Course
MIT Pune Economics Faculty
IES Management Institute
NMIMS Business Management Course

She was also a visiting faculty on stock markets at IIM Ahmedabad

Awards and achievements
First woman president of Bombay Stock Exchange in the 125 years of the exchange's existence
Awarded for outstanding contribution in the field of banking and financial services by Ladies Wing Indian Merchant Chamber
Honoured by Cosmos Bank for outstanding contribution in the field of finance in December 2005
Awarded as outstanding Young Indian in Business Category by Indian Jaycees in 1998
Awarded outstanding Alumni Award by NMIMS in 2011

Personal life
Mehta has been married to Asit Mehta since 1984 and has two sons, Aditya and Aakash. In August 2018, Mehta discussed her upbringing and personal interests on the VartaLab podcast.

References

Businesspeople from Mumbai
Living people
University of Mumbai alumni
Gujarati people
Businesswomen from Maharashtra
Year of birth missing (living people)